The deep petrosal nerve is a branch of the internal carotid plexus which runs through the carotid canal lateral to the internal carotid artery. It enters the cartilaginous substance which fills the foramen lacerum, and joins with the greater petrosal nerve to form the nerve of the pterygoid canal, also known as the Vidian nerve. The deep petrosal nerve carries postganglionic sympathetic axons to the pterygopalatine ganglion, which pass through without synapsing. These axons innervate blood vessels and mucous glands of the head and neck. The neuron cell bodies of the axons which form the deep petrosal nerve are found in the superior cervical ganglion.

Additional images

References

External links
 
 Table at doctor_uae

Nerves